Bobi Bozhinovski (Macedonian: Боби Божиновски; born 24 February 1981) is a Macedonian footballer currently playing for FK Makedonija Gjorče Petrov as a midfielder.

References

External links
 

1981 births
Living people
Footballers from Skopje
Association football midfielders
Macedonian footballers
North Macedonia international footballers
FK Vardar players
FK Belasica players
FK Makedonija Gjorče Petrov players
FK Cementarnica 55 players
FK Vėtra players
FK Sūduva Marijampolė players
FK Rabotnički players
FC Astana players
FK Teteks players
FK Pelister players
Macedonian First Football League players
A Lyga players
Kazakhstan Premier League players
Macedonian expatriate footballers
Expatriate footballers in Lithuania
Macedonian expatriate sportspeople in Lithuania
Expatriate footballers in Kazakhstan
Macedonian expatriate sportspeople in Kazakhstan